Adoration of the Christ Child is a painting previously attributed to Hieronymus Bosch portraying Mary and the Christ Child. It was created c. 1568, long after Bosch's death. It is held in the Wallraf-Richartz Museum in Cologne.

See also
Adoration of the Child (disambiguation)

References

1560s paintings
Paintings by Hieronymus Bosch
Nativity of Jesus in art
Nude art
Collections of the Wallraf–Richartz Museum
Cattle in art